"Darkness, Darkness" is a song written by Jesse Colin Young in 1969, which has been covered by many artists.  Young's band The Youngbloods released a version on their 1969 album Elephant Mountain.  They released a version of the song as a single twice: in 1969, which reached #124 on the Billboard chart, and in 1970, which reached #86 on the chart.

Robert Plant released a version of the song as a single in 2002 that reached #27 on the rock chart.  It was featured on his 2002 album Dreamland.

Cover versions
 1971 Mott the Hoople on the album Brain Capers
 1972 Phil Upchurch on the album Darkness, Darkness
 1976 Iain Matthews on the album Go for Broke, also included on Matthews' compilation Discreet Repeat (1981)
 1980 Eric Burdon on the album Darkness Darkness
 1994 Richie Havens on the album Cuts to the Chase
 1994 Screaming Trees on the True Lies Original Motion Picture Soundtrack (Epic Records)
 1995 Golden Earring on the album Love Sweat
 1996 Heidi Berry on the album Miracle
 1997 Richard Shindell on the album Reunion Hill
 2001 Elliott Murphy and Iain Matthews on the album La Terre Commune
 2002 Solas on the album The Edge of Silence
 2002 Robert Plant on the album Dreamland
 2004 Cowboy Junkies on the 'neath Your Covers, Part 1, a bonus disc to their album One Soul Now
 2007 Ann Wilson on the album Hope & Glory (with sister Nancy Wilson)
 2009 Helium Vola on the album Für Euch, die Ihr liebt
 2018 Escondido, featured on This Is Us season 3 episode 4, as well as the original version

Other credits 
1983: appeared in the film Purple Haze
1993: appeared in the opening credits of the film Jack the Bear
2003: played during the credits of the film Ghosts of the Abyss (by Lisa Torban)
2005: played during the ending credits of the film The Devil's Rejects
2015: played (in part) during the ending credits of episode 11 of Bloodline
2018: played on the opening scene of This Is Us season 3 episode 4 (the cover by Escondido was played at the end of the same episode)

References

External links
 

1969 singles
1969 songs
1970 singles
2002 singles
Eric Burdon songs
Golden Earring songs
Mott the Hoople songs
RCA Victor singles
Robert Plant songs
Screaming Trees songs
The Youngbloods songs